Indian Institute of Crafts & Design (IICD Jaipur) is an academic institution located in Jaipur, India offering undergraduate and postgraduate programmes in areas of Craft Design. Indian Institute of Crafts and Design (IICD) is an autonomous institute set up by the Government of Rajasthan.

History
It has programs in Education, Training & Outreach, Research and Documentation and Advisory & Consultancy services.

Programs
SMS- Soft Material Specialization

HMS- Hard Material Specialization

FMS- Fired Material Specialization

FD- Fashion Design

CC- Craft Communication

Intake is 30 seats per department per year.

Student publications
 "CHISEL" - First publications of Chisel Pdf

Presently managed
Presently it is being managed by the Ambuja Educational Institute (AEI) under the Public–private partnership model.

Design schools in India
Universities and colleges in Jaipur
Educational institutions established in 1997
1997 establishments in Rajasthan